Hazelton Township is the name of some places in the U.S. state of Minnesota:
Hazelton Township, Aitkin County, Minnesota
Hazelton Township, Kittson County, Minnesota

See also
Hazelton Township (disambiguation)

Minnesota township disambiguation pages